Liga Nacional de Fútbol de Guatemala (National Football League of Guatemala), officially known as the Liga Guate Banural for sponsorship reasons, formerly known as Liga Mayor "A" (Major League "A") is a professional football division in Guatemala, the highest one in the country. It is sanctioned by the Federación Nacional de Fútbol de Guatemala. The champion and runner-up teams of the Liga Nacional's official tournaments qualify to participate in international competitions within their regional confederation. Twelve teams currently compete in the league. Municipal and Comunicaciones are the two most successful clubs in the league to date, having won 31 tournaments respectively.

History
Its first official professional tournament took place in 1942, and succeeded what was known as the Liga Capitalina (League of the Capital), which was an amateur tournament that started in 1919. The 1942-43 tournament was played by seven teams in a double round-robin tournament. Three teams – Municipal, Tipografía Nacional, and Guatemala FC – finished tied for the first place after the two rounds. A playoff between the three teams was conducted to determine the winner, with Municipal earning their first national title.

Competition format
The league has had several different formats throughout its history; currently, the league season is divided into two tournaments. The Apertura, which is played in the fall, and the Clausura, which is played in the spring. The first 6 clubs in the standings at the end of each competition participate in the playoffs to determine the champion, 1st and 2nd place teams qualify directly to semi-finals, while the others have to play in the quarter-finals. The winners of the Apertura and Clausura tournaments participate in the CONCACAF Champions League.

At the end of 2008-2009 Apertura and Clausura tournaments the league expanded to 12 teams to compete in a larger versions of the Apertura and Clausura tournaments. Now the 12th placed team (the team with the fewest points) in the aggregated table standings (combined standings of both the Apertura and Clausura tournaments) is relegated to the Primera División de Ascenso (2nd division) automatically at the end of the Clausura tournament in late May. The teams that finish 10th and 11th in the aggregated table standings enter into a two-legged playoff with the second- and third-placed clubs of the Primera División de Ascenso. The playoff winners play in the top division while the losers spend the next season in the second division.

Current teams

Champions in Guatemalan Football History
Champions were: 
Amateur and Professional Champions.

Top Goalscorers

See also
Guatemala national football team

References

External links
Liga Nacional de Fútbol de Guatemala 
League at FIFA
Guatemala, 100 años de fútbol - prensalibre.com - Prensa Libre newspaper, Guatemala. 
guatefutbol.com 
League Summary at Soccerway 

 
Guatemala
1
Sports leagues established in 1919